Kobbari Lavuju is a famous sweet in Godavari and Krishna districts in the state of Andhra Pradesh. The key ingredients are grated coconut, sugar, jaggery and spices like elaichi. This is a traditional dish prepared especially on festival days and other auspicious days.

Indian desserts
Foods containing coconut